The 1949–50 Scottish League Cup was the fourth season of Scotland's second football knockout competition. The competition was won by East Fife, who defeated Dunfermline Athletic in the Final.

First round

Group 1

Group 2

Group 3

Group 4

Group 5

Group 6

Group 7

Group 8

Quarter-finals

First Leg

Second Leg

Semi-finals

Final

References

General

Specific

1949–50 in Scottish football
Scottish League Cup seasons